John L. Williams may refer to:
 John L. Williams (American football) (born 1964), American football player
 John L. Williams (Welsh nationalist) (1924–2004), Welsh nationalist activist and politician
 John Leonard Williams (1940–2019), Australian rules footballer
 John Lewis Williams (rugby union, born 1882) or Johnny Williams (1882–1916), Welsh rugby player
 John Lewis Williams (rugby union, born 1940), Australian rugby player
 John Lloyd Williams (botanist and musician) (1854–1945), Welsh botanist, author, and musician
 John Lloyd Williams (politician) (1892–1982), British Member of Parliament
 John Lloyd Williams (RAF officer) (born 1894), British air force officer

See also 
 John Williams (disambiguation)
 John Lloyd Williams (disambiguation)